The KDPG-aldolase RNA motif is a conserved RNA structure that was discovered by bioinformatics.
KDPG-aldolase motifs are found in Enterobacteriaceae, but is not known to be bpresent in Escherichia coli.

It is ambiguous whether KDPG-aldolase RNAs function as cis-regulatory elements or whether they operate in trans.  KDPG-aldolase RNAs appear to be in the 5′ untranslated regions of enterobacterial genes that are annotated as encoding aldolases of 2-keto-3-deoxy-6-phosphogluconate or 2-keto-4-hydroxyglutarate.

References

Non-coding RNA